Oh Sung-sik (born 12 September 1970) is a South Korean basketball player. He competed in the men's tournament at the 1996 Summer Olympics.

References

External links
 

1970 births
Living people
South Korean men's basketball players
Olympic basketball players of South Korea
Basketball players at the 1996 Summer Olympics
Place of birth missing (living people)
Asian Games medalists in basketball
Asian Games silver medalists for South Korea
Basketball players at the 1994 Asian Games
Medalists at the 1994 Asian Games
1994 FIBA World Championship players
Sportspeople from Busan